The Scottish city of Aberdeen has a number of green spaces and walkways. The parks, gardens and floral displays which include 2 million roses, 11 million daffodils and 3 million crocuses have led the city to win the Royal Horticultural Society's Britain in Bloom Best City award many times, including a period of nine years straight. It won the 2006 Scotland in Bloom Best City award along with the International Cities in Bloom award. The suburb of Dyce also won the Small Towns award.

City parks 
Aberdeen City Council's website states the city has six "city parks". In rank order these are:

NB, little data is available for the area of Aberdeen Beach and Queens Links - this may affect the rankings.

Local parks
Aberdeen City Council's website states the city has seven "local parks". Some of these are

 Allan Park, a small park near Cults.
 Johnston Gardens (1 hectare (10,000 m2)) is situated in the Rubislaw area. It hosts many different types of flowers and plants which have been renowned for their beauty which have led the gardens to winning categories in the 'Britain in Bloom' competitions.
 Rubislaw Terrace Gardens a small  park in the centre of Aberdeen, near Queens Cross.
 Stewart Park (5 acres (20,000 m2)) opened in 1894 and is situated in the Hilton area. The park was named after a former Lord Provost of the city, Sir David Stewart. There are sections is reserved for cricket and football matches.
 Union Terrace Gardens (1 hectare (10,000 m2)) opened in 1879 and is situated in the centre of the city. The gardens are a popular rendezvous in the heart of the city, enjoyed by both locals and visitors.  Surrounding the gardens are a number of important ancient protected Elm Trees, and during the summer season at the north end, a formally planted and maintained City Coat of Arms.

Walkways

The Deeside Way is a popular walkway and track that is used by cyclists and walkers. The trail runs from the Duthie Park to Peterculter along the former Deeside Railway which has had its tracks lifted.

The Formartine and Buchan Way is a walkway along old railway route the Formartine and Buchan Railway which ran from Dyce to Fraserburgh. The current walkway is along the entire old route where the tracks have been lifted much like the Deeside Way. The track runs almost parallel to the National Cycle Network track between Dyce and Auchnagatt, where the tracks cross over.

There are various walks and trails, punctuated by sculptures, through Tyrebagger Woods, west of Aberdeen off the A96 road.

Footnotes

Parks in Aberdeen